Osman Jovan Kakay (born 25 August 1997) is a Sierra Leonean footballer who plays as a defender for EFL Championship club Queens Park Rangers. Born in England, he represents the Sierra Leone national team.

Kakay was born in Westminster to parents from Sierra Leone.

Club career

Queens Park Rangers
After playing in Queens Park Rangers' academy, Kakay signed his first professional contract with the club in 2015. On 29 January 2016, he signed a new one-year deal to keep him at QPR until 2017.

He made his first QPR appearance starting out of position in the right of midfield in an EFL Cup second round victory over Rochdale, before being substituted after 73 minutes to an ovation from the Queens Park Rangers support.

In November 2018, QPR offered Kakay a contract extension, extending his deal at Loftus Road to 2021.

On 5 September 2020, Kakay scored his first professional goal in an EFL Cup tie against Plymouth Argyle.

On 1 May 2021, Kakay scored his first Championship goal in a 2–0 win away to Stoke City.

Livingston (loan)
On 29 January 2016, Kakay signed a loan deal at Livingston until the end of the season. Kakay made his professional debut on 30 January 2016, playing the full game in Livingston's 1–0 away loss to Dumbarton in the Scottish Championship.

Chesterfield (loan)
On 31 January 2017, Kakay signed a loan deal at Chesterfield until the end of the 2016–17 season.

Partick Thistle (loan)
On 2 September 2019, Kakay signed for Partick Thistle on loan until January 2020. Kakay originally played as a right back for Thistle, but played as a right winger for the majority of his stay at the Glasgow club.

International career
On 9 September 2018 Kakay made his international debut for Sierra Leone against Ethiopia in an Africa Cup of Nations qualifier.

In December 2021, Kakay was named in the Sierra Leone squad for the upcoming 2021 Africa Cup of Nations as the nation prepared for their first appearance at the competition since 1996. Kakay played the full ninety minutes of his side's opening match as they held one of the pre-tournament favourites and holders Algeria to a goalless draw.

Career statistics

References

External links

1997 births
Living people
People with acquired Sierra Leonean citizenship
Sierra Leonean footballers
Association football defenders
Livingston F.C. players
Partick Thistle F.C. players
Scottish Professional Football League players
Sierra Leone international footballers
Sierra Leonean expatriate footballers
Sierra Leonean expatriates in Scotland
Expatriate footballers in Scotland
Sierra Leonean people of Nigerian descent
Footballers from Westminster
English footballers
Queens Park Rangers F.C. players
Chesterfield F.C. players
English Football League players
English expatriate footballers
Black British sportspeople
English sportspeople of Sierra Leonean descent
English sportspeople of Nigerian descent
2021 Africa Cup of Nations players